Karimabad (also Romanized as Karīmābād) is a village in Kolah Boz-e Gharbi Rural District, in the Central District of Meyaneh County, East Azerbaijan Province, Iran. At the 2006 census, its population was 34, in 7 families.

References 

Populated places in Meyaneh County